"Tell the World I'm Here" is a pop song released in 2013 by Swedish singer songwriter Ulrik Munther. He took part in Melodifestivalen 2013 on 9 March that year, in a bid to represent Sweden in Eurovision Song Contest 2013 in Malmö, Sweden. The song came third overall after Robin Stjernberg won with "You" and Yohio was runner-up with "Heartbreak Hotel".

Charts

References

2013 songs
2013 singles
Ulrik Munther songs
Melodifestivalen songs of 2013
Songs written by Peter Boström
Songs written by Thomas G:son
Universal Music Group singles